Lynn Eves (born 12 March 1942) is a Canadian sprinter. He competed in the men's 100 metres at the 1960 Summer Olympics. He was eliminated in the semi-finals of the 220 yards and in the quarter-finals of the 100 yards of the 1962 British Empire and Commonwealth Games. And he finished sixth with the 4×440 yards relay team (with Don Bertoia, George Shepherd, and Bill Crothers) at the 1962 British Empire and Commonwealth Games.

References

1942 births
Living people
Athletes (track and field) at the 1960 Summer Olympics
Canadian male sprinters
Olympic track and field athletes of Canada
Athletes (track and field) at the 1959 Pan American Games
Athletes (track and field) at the 1962 British Empire and Commonwealth Games
Commonwealth Games competitors for Canada
Athletes from Victoria, British Columbia
Pan American Games track and field athletes for Canada